Jamarko Simmons (born September 23, 1986) is an American football wide receiver who is currently a free agent. He was originally signed by the Green Bay Packers as an undrafted free agent in 2009 but was cut after sustaining a leg injury that sidelined him for several weeks.

Early years
Simmons played high school football, basketball and track for Flint Central High School in Flint, Michigan.

College career
Simmons played football at Western Michigan University, and was a standout wide receiver. He is the Broncos all-time receptions leader.

Professional career

Virginia Destroyers
Simmons was signed by the Virginia Destroyers of the United Football League on July 6, 2011. Simmons helped the Destroyers win the 2011 UFL Championship Game.

Jacksonville Sharks
Simmons signed with the Jacksonville Sharks of the Arena Football League on July 19, 2011. Simmons was a key contributor for the Sharks throughout the 2011 season. The Sharks won Arena Bowl XXVI, in which Simmons scored three touchdowns.

New York Jets
Simmons was signed by the New York Jets to their practice squad on October 31, 2011. Simmons was placed on the practice squad injured reserve list on December 12, 2011 after suffering a back injury.

Jacksonville Sharks
On April 10, 2012, it was announced that Simmons signed on for his second stint with the Jacksonville Sharks.

San Jose SaberCats
Simmons played the 2013 season with the San Jose SaberCats.

Iowa Barnstormers
On November 22, 2013, the SaberCats traded Simmons to the Iowa Barnstormers in exchange for waiver positioning.

Las Vegas Outlaws
On October 28, 2014, Simmons was assigned to the Las Vegas Outlaws.

References

External links
New York Jets bio

1986 births
Living people
American football wide receivers
Players of American football from Flint, Michigan
Western Michigan Broncos football players
Jacksonville Sharks players
Virginia Destroyers players
San Jose SaberCats players
Iowa Barnstormers players
Las Vegas Outlaws (arena football) players
Flint Central High School alumni